Pavoclinus graminis, the Grass klipfish, is a species of clinid found along the coast of southern Africa from Inhambane, Mozambique to False Bay South Africa.  It is mostly found in tide pools where it prefers weedy areas.  It can reach a maximum length of  TL.

References

External links
 Photograph

graminis
Fish described in 1908